Basic interpersonal communicative skills (BICS) are language skills needed to interact in social situations, for example, when chatting to a friend.

BICS refers primarily to context-bound, face-to-face communication, like the language first learned by toddlers and preschoolers, which is used in everyday social interaction. 

This term is often credited to Jim Cummins' research related to language acquisition and learning. The other term that is often used in conjunction with this term is cognitive academic language proficiency (CALP). CALP refers to the highly abstract, decontextualized communication that takes place in the classroom, especially in the later elementary grades. CALP involves the "language of learning," which enables children to problem-solve, hypothesize, imagine, reason and project into situations with which they have no personal experience. It is a prerequisite for learning to read and write and for overall academic success. The implications of the BICS and CALP concepts for children are that the second language or language of the classroom needs to be sufficiently well-developed for her or him to be able to meet the cognitive demands of the academic setting. Students typically are thought to acquire BICS in 2–3 years, but take 5–7 years to develop the CALP needed to be on the same level with their native speaking counterparts in the classroom.

Although the terms BICS and CALP are still widely used, Cummins has more recently used the terms conversational language and "academic language."

References

Human communication